Reparation(s) may refer to:

Christianity 
 Restitution (theology), the Christian doctrine calling for reparation 
Acts of reparation, prayers for repairing the damages of sin

History 

War reparations
World War I reparations, made from Germany due to the signing of the Treaty of Versailles
Reparations Agreement between Israel and the Federal Republic of Germany, Holocaust reparations

Law 
Reparation (legal), the legal philosophy
Reparations (transitional justice), measures taken by the state to redress gross and systematic violations of human rights law or humanitarian law
Reparations for slavery, proposed compensation for the Atlantic slave trade, to assist the descendants of enslaved peoples
 Reparations for slavery in the United States
Reparations (website), website devoted to cause of compensation for the descendants of the Transatlantic Slave Trade

Music 
Reparation (album), a reggae album by musician Eddy Grant
 "Reparation", a song on that album
"Reparations!", a song by rapper Ka$hdami